John F. Szabo (born 1968) is an American librarian, library executive, and the twentieth City Librarian of Los Angeles, the chief executive of the Los Angeles Public Library. He previously served as the Director of the Atlanta-Fulton Public Library System, Clearwater (FL) Public Library System, Palm Harbor (FL) Public Library, and the Robinson (IL) Public Library District. In 2015, the Los Angeles Public Library won the National Medal for Museum and Library Service, the nation's highest honor for a library or museum. Awarded by the Institute for Museum and Library Services (IMLS), the medal was presented by First Lady Michelle Obama at a White House ceremony.

Biography
Szabo was born in Orlando, Florida, and grew up in Montgomery, Alabama. At age 16, Szabo started working as a library clerk at Gunter Air Force Base.

Szabo received his bachelor's degree in telecommunications from the University of Alabama and his master's degree in information and library studies at the University of Michigan.

Szabo was appointed director of the public library district serving the city of Robinson and Crawford County, Illinois. His experience then extended to the Atlanta-Fulton Public Library System (Director 2005-2012), Clearwater Public Library System in Florida, and Palm Harbor Public Library, also in Florida. During his Florida tenure, he served as Florida Library Association president. Szabo became City Librarian of Los Angeles in 2012.

Honors 
In 2020, Szabo was awarded the Betsy Plank Distinguished Achievement Award from the University of Alabama College of Communication and Information Sciences.

Alumni Achievement Award, University of Michigan School of Information, 2010.

Szabo was featured in the New York Times best seller and Washington Post top 10 book of the year The Library Book by Susan Orlean, 2019.

Named as a "Culture Czar" in "The Gay List: 50 Icons and Iconoclasts Who are Transforming the City." Los Angeles Magazine, Pride Issue, June 2019.

For his support of the Mexican community of Los Angeles, he received an award of recognition from the University of Guadalajara Foundation and the Universidad de Guadalajara.

Publications
Author of Death and Dying: An Annotated Bibliography of the Thanatological Literature.

Author of The Bayeux Tapestry: A Critically Annotated Bibliography.

References

Living people
1968 births
American librarians
People from Los Angeles
People from Orlando, Florida
People from Montgomery, Alabama
University of Alabama alumni
University of Michigan School of Information alumni
Date of birth missing (living people)